Bangladesh Enterprise Institute is a private research institute and independent think tank. Salman F Rahman is the chairman of the board of governors and members include Ragib Ali. The institute is run by Farooq Sobhan and Ambassador M. Humayun Kabir, acting president.

History
Bangladesh Enterprise Institute was established in October 2000 by Salman F. Rahman of Beximco Group. It purpose is to encourage the development of small and medium-sized enterprises in Bangladesh. The organization lobbies for reform of regulations and the encouragement of the free market. It is funded by its board of governors. It works with the United States-based International Republican Institute.

Bangladesh Enterprise Institute organizes conferences on economic and international affairs issues. In 2018, the Institute for Policy, Advocacy and Governance ranked Bangladesh Enterprise Institute on a list of Top Think Tanks in Southeast Asia and the Pacific region.

Board of Governors 

 Salman F Rahman
 Ragib Ali
 Khan Md. Ameer
 Tapan Chowdhury
 A. Matin Chowdhury
 Minhaz Kamal Khan
 Md Rafiqul Haque
 S M Abdul Mannan
 A S F Rahman
 Zulfiquar Rahman
 Abdul Hai Sarkar
 Altaf Hossain Sarkar
 Ramzul Seraj
 A K M Shamsuddoha
 M Abu Taher
 Farooq Sobhan

References

2000 establishments in Bangladesh
Organisations based in Dhaka
Research institutes in Bangladesh
Think tanks based in Bangladesh